The Colburn School is a private music school in Los Angeles with a focus on music and dance. It consists of four divisions: the Conservatory of Music, Music Academy, Community School of Performing Arts and the Dance Academy. It is located adjacent to the Museum of Contemporary Art and across the street from the Walt Disney Concert Hall.

History
The school was established in 1950 as a preparatory arm of the USC Thornton School of Music. It was originally located across the street from the Shrine Auditorium, in a warehouse that had been converted into extra USC practice rooms, rehearsal halls, and dance studios. It later broadened its mission and changed its name to the Community School of Performing Arts. In 1980, it finalized its split with USC and branched out on its own. 

In 1985, the school received a significant endowment from Richard D. Colburn and was subsequently renamed in his honor. The school moved from its original location near the USC campus to its current location in downtown Los Angeles in 1998. Five years later, the Colburn Conservatory of Music was established to provide tertiary music education with a unique all-scholarship model. In 2010, the school opened the Colburn Music Academy, a highly selective program designed for young pre-collegiate musicians.

In 2014, the Colburn Dance Academy was launched as the pre-professional ballet program of the Trudl Zipper Dance Institute. Former New York City Ballet principal dancer Jenifer Ringer was appointed as dean and Benjamin Millepied was made artistic advisor. The same year, pianist Jean-Yves Thibaudet became the school’s first Artist-in-Residence.

Programs 
The Conservatory of Music currently offers a Bachelor of Music degree, a Master of Music degree, a Performance Diploma, an Artist Diploma, and a Professional Studies Certificate to students. All students at the Conservatory receive full scholarship including housing and stipends. The Dean of the Conservatory is Lee Cioppa.

The Conservatory is also home to the Negaunee Conducting Program. Led by conductor and composer Esa-Pekka Salonen, fellows of the program pursue either undergraduate or graduate conducting diplomas. Apart from working with various ensembles at Colburn, they gain significant real-world experience from assisting Salonen at the San Francisco Symphony and serving as assistant conductors for his engagements internationally.

The Music Academy offers a comprehensive curriculum of courses, which include music theory, ear training, singing and a vigorous chamber music program for gifted young musicians. The Dean of the Academy is Adrian Daly.

The Community School of Performing Arts serves children in the community through to age 18 and offers classes for several disciplines: Ensembles, Jazz, Music Theory, Piano, Strings, Voice and Choir, Woodwinds, Brass, Percussion and Drama. The Dean of the Community School is Susan Cook.

The Dance Academy offers a rigorous program for dancers between the ages of 14 and 19 to prepare them for a professional career. The curriculum has a focus on classical ballet while also providing instruction for other styles. The Dean of the Dance Academy is Silas Farley.

Admission 

In an unidentified year, 500 applicants applied to the Colburn School's Conservatory of Music and 26 were accepted for a 5% acceptance rate. Approximately 110 students attend the Conservatory of Music, and more than 1,500 students are enrolled in classes at the Community School of Performing Arts.

Facilities and architecture
The Colburn School's main building was designed by the architectural firm Hardy Holzman Pfeiffer Associates. It includes the Lloyd Wright designed studio of Jascha Heifetz. Originally situated in Heifetz's backyard, it was saved from demolition and rebuilt on the second floor of the school's Grand Avenue building. Also located in the building is Zipper Hall, a concert venue that hosts both professional and student performances throughout the year. The Los Angeles Philharmonic and Los Angeles Chamber Orchestra have both performed chamber music concerts at the venue.

In 2016, the Colburn School bought an outdoor parking lot on the corner of 2nd and Olive Streets for $33 million. In 2022, it announced plans to build a Frank Gehry designed 1,000-seat concert hall along with several dance studios and a performance plaza on the site.

Notable faculty
 Ted Atkatz - percussion
 Andrew Bain - horn
 Martin Beaver - chamber music and violin
 Fabio Bidini - piano
 Paul Coletti - viola
 Silas Farley - dance
 Yehuda Gilad - clarinet
 Thomas Kotcheff - ear training and music theory
 Mark Lawrence - trombone
 Ronald Leonard - cello
 Teng Li - viola
 Robert Lipsett - violin
 Tatjana Masurenko - viola
 Norman Pearson - tuba
 Esa-Pekka Salonen - conducting
 Ory Shihor - piano
 Arnold Steinhardt - violin
 JoAnn Turovsky - harp
 Jim Walker - flute

Notable alumni
 Kris Bowers - composer and pianist
 Calder Quartet - ensemble
 Calidore String Quartet - ensemble
 Robert Chen - violinist
 Danielle de Niese - soprano
 Jennifer Frautschi - violinist
 David Fung - pianist
 Leila Josefowicz - violinist
 Tamaki Kawakubo - violinist
 Anne Akiko Meyers - violinist
 Blake Pouliot - violinist
 Eric Reed - jazz pianist
 Albert Cano Smit - pianist
 Mikyung Sung - double bassist
 Michael Tilson Thomas - conductor

References

External links
Official website

Music schools in California
Schools in Los Angeles
Schools of the performing arts in the United States
Performing arts education in the United States
Educational institutions established in 1950
1950 establishments in California
Bunker Hill, Los Angeles